Joshua Sunday Oyinlola is an Anglican bishop in Nigeria. He is Bishop of Irele-Eseodo in the Anglican Province of Ondo. He was elected as bishop in 2019.

He was consecrated Bishop of  Irele-Eseodo in April 2019 at St David's Anglican Cathedral Church, Ijomu, Akure, by the Primate of All Nigeria, Nicholas Okoh.

Notes

Anglican bishops of Irele-Eseodo
21st-century Anglican bishops in Nigeria
Year of birth missing (living people)
Living people